Sand Branch (sometimes spelled Sandbranch) is an unincorporated community in Dallas County, Texas, United States. According to the Handbook of Texas, the community had an estimated population of 400 in 2000. The community did not participate in the 2010 Census. More recent (2019) estimates put the population around 100.

Geography
Sand Branch is located approximately two miles south of U.S. Highway 175 and 14 miles southeast of Downtown Dallas on Belt Line Road in southeastern Dallas County. It is situated between the Trinity River and Hickory Creek, southwest of Seagoville. Sand Branch is the only unincorporated settlement left in Dallas County, as the vast majority of the county lies within incorporated cities.

Background
The Sand Branch Community has long been considered one of the poorest areas in Dallas County and community was formed for freed Black Americans but some of the original families have been forced out by poor living conditions or forced to sell their land for as low as $300, while a small portion of the original families are still holding on to the lands   . The area's living conditions and lack of basic services have led some to label the largely lower-income, predominantly African American community a "non-border colonia" because of its similarities to those settlements situated along the southwestern United States border with Mexico.  One of the challenges of the community is that residents must transport water to use it: despite existing next to a Wastewater Treatment facility. No water infrastructure exists in Sand Branch (due to its unincorporated status), and the wells are non-potable due to decades of contamination.

Streets
Eight streets are located within the community Sand Branch. They are:

Education
Public education in the community of Sand Branch is provided by the Dallas Independent School District. Zoned campuses include Kleberg Elementary School (grades PK-5), Seagoville Middle School (grades 6-8), and Seagoville High School (grades 9-12).

References

External links

Unincorporated communities in Dallas County, Texas
Unincorporated communities in Texas
Dallas–Fort Worth metroplex